The Omloop van het Zuidwesten was a Belgian cycling race organized for the last time in 1982. 

The course was around 185 km, with Hulste as both start and finish place.

The competition's roll of honor includes the successes of Roger De Vlaeminck, Walter Godefroot and Patrick Sercu.

Winners

References 

Cycle races in Belgium
1963 establishments in Belgium
Defunct cycling races in Belgium
Recurring sporting events established in 1963
Recurring sporting events disestablished in 1982
1982 disestablishments in Belgium